Francis Benjamin Kates was a politician in Queensland, Australia. He was a Member of the Queensland Legislative Assembly. He was the Member for Darling Downs from 26 November 1878 until 1 November 1881, and from 1 October 1883 until 4 May 1888. He was the Independent Member for Cunningham from 11 March 1899 until his death on 26 September 1903.

He was born on 1 July 1830 in Berlin, Prussia, the son of Benjamin Kates and his wife, Henrietta. He married Sarah Matthews in London in 1858. He had two sons and a daughter.

References

Members of the Queensland Legislative Assembly
1830 births
1903 deaths
German emigrants to Australia
People from Berlin
19th-century Australian politicians